The 2015–16 Grand Canyon Antelopes women's basketball team represents Grand Canyon University in Phoenix, Arizona, during the 2015–16 college basketball season. It was head coach Trent May's ninth season at Grand Canyon. The Antelopes compete as members of the Western Athletic Conference and played their home games at GCU Arena. This was year 3 of a 4-year transition period from D2 to D1. As a result, the Antelopes wasn't eligible to make the D1 or D2 Basketball Tournaments and will not participate in this season's WAC Basketball Tournament. However the Antelopes did compete in the WBI where they lost in the first round to North Dakota. They finished the season 16–15, 8–6 in WAC play to finish in a 3 tie for third place.

Roster

Schedule and Results

|-
!colspan=9 style="background:#522D80; color:white;"| Non-conference regular season

|-
!colspan=9 style="background:#522D80; color:white;"| WAC regular season

|-
!colspan=9 style="background:#522D80; color:white;"| WBI

See also 
2015–16 Grand Canyon Antelopes men's basketball team

References 

Grand Canyon Antelopes women's basketball seasons
Grand Canyon